The Man from Hell is a 1934 American Western film directed by Lewis D. Collins and starring Reb Russell, Fred Kohler and George 'Gabby' Hayes.

Cast
Reb Russell as Clint Mason
Fred Kohler as Mayor Anse McCloud
Ann Darcy as Nancy Campbell
George 'Gabby' Hayes as Colonel Campbell
Jack Rockwell as Marshal Lon Kelly
Charles K. French as Sandy - Blacksmith
Murdock MacQuarrie as Sheriff Jake Klein
Slim Whitaker as Tom - mine owner
Tommy Bupp as Timmy McCarrol
Yakima Canutt as Yak - henchman

References

External links

1934 Western (genre) films
American Western (genre) films
Films directed by Lewis D. Collins
1930s American films